Batoș is a commune in Mureș County, Transylvania, Romania. It is composed of four villages: Batoș, Dedrad (Dedrád; Zepling), Goreni (Dedrádszéplak; Ungarisch Zepling) and Uila (Vajola; Weilau).

See also 
 List of Hungarian exonyms (Mureș County)

References

Communes in Mureș County
Localities in Transylvania
Székely communities